Betsy's Wedding (1955) is the tenth and final book in the Betsy-Tacy series written by Maud Hart Lovelace. Set in Minneapolis, Minnesota, the book tells the story of the early married life of the main character, Betsy Ray, and her high-school sweetheart, Joe. The characters of Tacy Kelly and Tib Muller also recur in this novel, as they did in all the novels covering the high-school years. The book, along with the entire Betsy-Tacy and Deep Valley series, was republished in 2000 by HarperTrophy with a new cover art illustrated by Michael Koelsch.

Plot summary 
Betsy returns to New York from her European trip, where Joe Willard is waiting for her. He wants to take her to Tiffany's and buy an engagement ring, but the more practical Betsy suggests he buys a wedding band instead. They spend the day in New York City enjoying many of Joe's favorite places, but more importantly renewing their love.

Betsy takes a train to Minneapolis, where her parents and younger sister are now living.  She breaks the news of her engagement to her family, who are surprised that Joe wants to marry Betsy without first asking her father and without having a job in Minnesota.  Her father is very upset. He thinks that Joe should have a job.  When Joe arrives at the train station, Betsy tells him that her father is uncomfortable about him not having a job. He immediately drives from newspaper office to newspaper office before finding a job on a publicity campaign to help the people of Belgium (who were the victims of atrocities during World War I). Betsy's father respects Joe's go-getter attitude and allows the wedding to proceed.
Joe and Betsy live with her parents while looking for an apartment to rent. With younger sister Margaret's help they find the perfect newlywed's home. Betsy struggles with her first forays into cooking, but eventually becomes a very good cook - and even has fun making some of Joe's favorite foods! Several happy months later, Joe's widowed aunt asks to live with them & Joe tells her yes, although Betsy resents her coming. Joe is aware of her feelings (she had been hoping to bring a baby into their happy home; not Joe's aunt) & this is the first serious difference  of opinion in their marriage. Betsy wants to agree with Joe but cannot help feeling bitter until she has an epiphany & realizes that Joe's generosity  is one of the things she loves about him. In the end she enjoys Joe's aunt's company and her wonderful stories, especially when Joe begins working the night shift writing headlines for the newspaper. Meanwhile, Betsy and Tacy unite to try to find a husband for Tib. They introduce her to Mr. Bagshaw (a colleague of Harry's), who quickly falls in love with Tib. He proposes & Tib turns him down. Betsy and Tacy are relieved, having realized that if she had married him, Tib would have moved to NYC. Betsy then introduces Tib to Rocky, a "Tramp" journalist they meet at "The Violent Study Club" (a group of friends & fellow writers with whom Betsy & Joe hone their writing skills).
But Rocky is terrible to Tib, even ridiculing her in front of friends! Finally Tib ends the relationship with Rocky & he leaves (thank goodness)! Eventually Tib meets a kind & handsome soldier while ice skating and they fall in love.

As the book ends, America enters World War I and Joe goes to a nearby officer's training camp.  They rent out their house & Betsy returns to her parents' home to live with them for the duration of the war.  Before Joe leaves, they are able to attend Tib's wedding in Deep Valley with family members and old friends.

References

Betsy-Tacy
1955 American novels
Novels set in Minneapolis
1955 children's books
Thomas Y. Crowell Co. books